Fatoş Yıldırım (born March 28, 1994) is a Turkish women's football midfielder, who plays in the Super League for Ankara BB Fomget GS  with jersey number 19. In 2013, she was called up to the Turkish national team.

Early life 
Fatoş Yıldırım was born in Turgutlu district of Manisa Province on March 28, 1994. She began playing football at a very young age in her local neighbourhood.

Club career 

She received her license on May 30, 2008, for her hometown club Turgutlu Belediyespor. In the beginning of the 2010–11 season, she transferred to Gölcükspor, where she played only one season. Since November 2011, she has been with Trabzon İdmanocağı.

After six seasons, she transferred to the Izmir-based club Konak Belediyespor in August 2017. She debıted at the UEFA Women's Champions League and played in three games of the 2017–18 qualifying round in Tbilisi, Georgia.

After one season with Konak Belediyespor, she moved to Gaziantep to join the recently promoted club ALG Spor in the Women's First League.

For the second half of the 2019-20 Women's First League season, she transferred to Ataşehir Belediyespor in Istanbul.

She signed with the Ankara-based Fomget Gençlik ve Spor in the 2021-22 Women's Super League.

International career 
Fatoş Yıldırım was called up to the Turkey girls' U-17 team, and debuted in the friendly match against Bulgaria on June 27, 2009. She cappen three times for the Turkey U-17 nationals.

She appeared in twenty games for the Turkey women's U-19 team, and scored one goal in the friendly match against Hungary.

Career statistics 
.

Honours 
 Turkish Women's First League
 Trabzon İdmanocağı
 Third places (2): 2011–12, 2014–15

 Konak Belediyespor
 Third places (1): 2017–18

 ALG Spor
 Runners-up (1): 2018–19

References

External links 
 

1994 births
Living people
People from Turgutlu
Turkish women's footballers
Women's association football midfielders
Turkey women's international footballers
Gölcükspor players
Trabzon İdmanocağı women's players
Konak Belediyespor players
ALG Spor players
Ataşehir Belediyespor players
Turkish Women's Football Super League players
Fomget Gençlik ve Spor players